T21, originally T2 is a diesel-hydraulic locomotive operated by Swedish State Railways and Nora Bergslags Järnväg (NBJ) of Sweden. 60 units were built during the 1950s by Maschinenbau Kiel and Svenska Järnvägsverkstäderna based on the German DB Class V65. The T21 was technically identical with the MaK 800D. The T21 was used to replace steam locomotives on branch lines. They were used until the 1990s.

The order consisted of 56 locomotives, of which ten were to be built in Sweden with a Swedish hydraulic shift, designated T3, later T22. The shift did not work particularly well, and only four were delivered, the rest with a German shift. Later two units were rebuilt to T21s. NBJ bought four T21 units in 1963.

External links
 Järnväg.net on T21

MaK locomotives
T21
D locomotives
Standard gauge locomotives of Sweden
Railway locomotives introduced in 1955